Spelling Reform 1 or Spelling Reform step 1 (more commonly known as SR1) is an English spelling reform proposal advocated by British/Australian linguist Harry Lindgren. It calls for the short  sound (as in bet) to always be spelt with E. For example, friend would become frend and head would become hed. SR1 was part of a 50-stage reform that Lindgren advocated in his book Spelling Reform: A New Approach (1969).

Spelling Reform 1 had some success in Australia. In 1975, the Australian Teachers' Federation adopted SR1 as a policy, although the Federation dissolved in 1987. 
However, there is no evidence outside this text that the system was "adopted widely" or indeed at all.

Examples:
 represented by a: any→eny
 represented by ai: said→sed
 represented by ea: ready→redy
 represented by ei: heifer→hefer
 represented by eo: jeopardy→jepardy
 represented by ie: friend→frend
 represented by u: bury→bery
 represented by ue: guess→gess

The following short poem is an example of SR1:
Draw a breth for progress,
Tred abrest ahed.
Fight agenst old spelling,
Better "red" than "read".
Spred the words at brekfast,
Mesure them in bed,
Dream of welth and tresure,
Better "ded" than "dead".

Stage 1

Using SR1 as a starting point, the Simplified Spelling Society (SSS) created a five-part reform proposal called Stage 1. The proposals were first printed in the November 1983 edition of the society's newsletter. In April 1984, they were adopted as the 'house style' of the SSS at its yearly meeting. The SSS said that the reforms could be used either together or individually (as a step-by-step change).

Their four extra proposals are:

DUE
DUE stands for "Drop Useless Es". This proposal would remove the letter E from words where it is unneeded or misleading. This would mean dropping the E at the end of have but not at the end of behave, because the E makes the A sound longer (see "magic e"). 
Thus: are→ar, were→wer, give→giv, have→hav, some→som, because→becaus, gauze→gauz, leave→leav, freeze→freez, sleeve→sleev, valley→vally, achieve→achiev, examine→examin, practise→practis, opposite→opposit, involve→involv, serve→serv, heart→hart.

ph
Thus: photo→foto, telephone→telefone, physical→fysical.
 
augh
Thus: caught→caut, fraught→fraut, daughter→dauter.
Thus: laugh→laf.

ough
Thus: through→thru.
Thus: though→tho, although→altho (but doh for dough).
Thus: bough→bou, drought→drout, plough→plou.
Thus: bought→baut, ought→aut, thought→thaut.
Change 'ough' to 'of' or 'uf' (depending on the pronunciation) when there is the sound .
Thus: cough→cof, enough→enuf, tough→tuf.

See also
List of reforms of the English language
Cut Spelling
Handbook of Simplified Spelling
C. J. Dennis
Traditional Spelling Revised
SoundSpel

References
Sources
Lindgren, Harry. Spelling Reform: A New Approach. Alpha Books, 1969.
Citations

English spelling reform
Education in Australia